Combined diesel-electric and gas (CODLAG) is a modification of the combined diesel and gas propulsion system for ships. A variant, called the combined diesel-electric or gas (CODLOG) system, contains the same basic elements but will not allow simultaneous use of the alternative drive sources.

A CODLAG system employs electric motors which are connected to the propeller shafts (usually 2). The motors are powered by diesel generators. For higher speeds, a gas turbine  powers the shafts via a cross-connecting gearbox; for cruise speed, the drive train of the turbine is disengaged with clutches.

This arrangement combines the diesel engines used for propulsion and for electric power generation, greatly reducing service cost, since it reduces the number of different diesel engines and electric motors, requiring considerably less maintenance. Also, electric motors work efficiently over a wide range of revolutions and can be connected directly to the propeller shaft  so that simpler gearboxes can be used to combine the mechanical output of turbine and diesel-electric systems.

Another advantage of the diesel-electric transmission is that without the need of a mechanical connection, the diesel generators can be decoupled acoustically from the hull of the ship, making it less noisy. This has been used extensively by military submarines but surface naval vessels like anti-submarine vessels will benefit as well.

Integrated electric propulsion (IEP) 

A system which uses both diesel engines and gas turbines to generate electricity for electric motors, where there is no mechanical transmission from either to the propellers, is not classified as CODLAG, but as integrated electric propulsion (IEP) or integrated full electric propulsion (IFEP).

List of CODLAG ships
 Type 23 frigate (Royal Navy) 
FREMM multipurpose frigate (Italian Navy) 
 F125 class frigate (German Navy)
Pohjanmaa-class corvette (Finnish Navy)
Constellation-class frigate (United States Navy)
 GTS Finnjet (Finnish cruiseferry)

List of CODLOG ships
 Polar-class icebreaker (United States Coast Guard)
 FREMM multipurpose frigate (French Navy)
 Daegu-class frigate (ROKN)
 Type 26 frigate (Royal Navy, under construction)

List of IEP ships
 RMS Queen Mary 2
 Wave class tanker (Royal Fleet Auxiliary)
 USNS Lewis and Clark (T-AKE-1) (US Sealift Command)
 Albion class landing platform dock (Royal Navy)
 Type 45 destroyer (Royal Navy)
 Queen Elizabeth-class aircraft carrier (Royal Navy)
  (US Navy)

See also
 Diesel-electric

References

Marine propulsion